Thene Manasulu may refer to:
 Thene Manasulu (1965 film)
 Thene Manasulu (1987 film)

See also 
Manaslu, 8th-highest mountain on Earth, located in Nepal